Simon Wilde (born 1960) is an English cricket journalist and author. He has written for The Times and The Sunday Times since 1998, and is currently the latter's cricket correspondent. Three of his books have been short-listed for the William Hill Sports Book of the Year award: Ranji: A Genius Rich and Strange (1990), Letting Rip: The Fast Bowling Threat from Lillee to Waqar (1994) and Shane Warne: Portrait of a Flawed Genius (2007).

When his book on Ranji was reissued in 2005, a reviewer in The Independent wrote that it was "superbly researched and as well written". In reviewing Wilde's book on Warne, Andrew Baker, writing in the Daily Telegraph, said that "Wilde has some pedigree in the quality cricket book market", and that the book "is a bit more than sensible and objective. It is entertaining, too..." 
 
In recent years, he has written the annual review of events in world cricket in the previous year for Wisden Cricketers' Almanack.

He has three children and lives in Hampshire.

Bibliography 
Ranji: A Genius Rich and Strange, Kingswood, 1990, 
Letting Rip: The Fast Bowling Threat from Lillee to Waqar, Gollancz/Witherby,  1994, 
Number One: The World's Best Batsmen and Bowlers, Gollancz, 1998, 
Caught: The Full Story of Corruption in International Cricket, Aurum Press,  2001, 
Shane Warne: Portrait of a Flawed Genius, John Murray Publishers, 2007, 
Ian Botham: The Power and the Glory, Simon & Schuster UK, 2011, 
England The Biography: The Story of English Cricket 1877-2019, Simon & Schuster UK, 2019, 

Note: He was also the ghost writer for Graham Thorpe's autobiography: Graham Thorpe: Rising from the Ashes (2005).

Notes 

Cricket historians and writers
British male journalists
Living people
The Times people
1960 births